Mabathoana High School is a secondary school in Maseru, Lesotho named for Emmanuel Mabathoana, the Archbishop of Lesotho attended by more than 600 students. It is particularly known for one of its more famous alumni, Thabang Makwetla.

References

Schools in Lesotho
Maseru